Miconia pseudorigida is a species of plant in the family Melastomataceae. It is endemic to Jamaica.  It is threatened by habitat loss.

References

pseudorigida
Endemic flora of Jamaica
Taxonomy articles created by Polbot

Critically endangered flora of North America